Thuringian Forest Nature Park is one of two nature parks in the state of Thuringia, Germany.

It extends around the Rennsteig and comprises almost the entire Thuringian Forest and the Thuringian Highlands with Eisenach in northwest and Sonneberg in the south. The nature park protection includes the   biosphere reservation, and a number of dams such as Tambach-Dietharz Dam, Schmalwasser Dam, Ohra Dam, Lütsche Dam and the Leibis-Lichte Dam.

The highest mountains in the park are the Großer Beerberg and the Schneekopf.

Biosphere Reserve 

The nature park is an expansion of an older protection; the "UNESCO Biosphere Reserve Thuringian Forest" established in 1979 as the first UNESCO biosphere reserve in Germany. The biosphere protection is located in the Thuringian-Franconian low mountains, and after expansions in 1990 and 2018 it now covers an area of 337 km².

See also 
 List of nature parks in Germany
 List of mountain and hill ranges in Germany

References

External links 
 

Thuringian Forest
Nature parks in Thuringia
South Thuringia